Perle Bouge (born 1 December 1977 in Rennes) is a French disabled rower, with a silver medal at the 2012 Summer Paralympics in London, and a bronze medal at the 2016 Summer Paralympics in Rio.

Biography 
Bouge participated in the trunk and arms category. She has won two paralympic medals in mixed doubles with Stéphane Tardieu: a silver medal at London 2012  and a bronze medal at Rio 2016.

Prize list

Paralympics 
 Summer paralympic games, 2012, London
  Silver, mixed double
 Summer paralympic games 2016, Rio de Janeiro
 Bronze, mixed double

World Cups 
 2010, Karapiro
 Silver medal in double mixed couple, 2011 in Bled
 two in mixed couple
 2013, Chungju
 Silver medal, double mixed couple
 2014, Amsterdam
 Silver medal, double mixed couple
 2018, Aiguebelette
 Gold medal, Single scull

France Championship 
 2010, 2011 and 2012 sculls

Distinctions 
 2013 Knight of the National Merit Order

References

External links 

 

1977 births
Living people
French female rowers
Paralympic rowers of France
Paralympic silver medalists for France
Paralympic bronze medalists for France
Rowers at the 2012 Summer Paralympics
Rowers at the 2016 Summer Paralympics
Medalists at the 2012 Summer Paralympics
Medalists at the 2016 Summer Paralympics
World Rowing Championships medalists for France
Sportspeople from Rennes
Paralympic medalists in rowing